is a Shinto kami, and is in Japanese mythology, the father of Japan's first Emperor, Emperor Jimmu.

Nomenclature and story

Basil Hall Chamberlain glossed the Kojiki name as "His Augustness Heaven's-Sun-Height-Prince-Wave-limit-Brave-Cormorant-Thatch-Meeting-Incompletely".

Ugayafukiaezu was a child of Hoori, the son of Ninigi-no-Mikoto, who was sent down by Amaterasu to govern the earth (Ashihara no Nakatsukuni) (believed to be equivalent to Japan), and of Toyotama-hime, a daughter of Ryūjin, the dragon kami of the sea.

Although Toyotama-hime became pregnant at the undersea palace of Ryūgū-jō, she opted not to bear the child in the ocean and decided to head to shore.

On the shore, her parents attempted to build a house in which she could give birth, and attempted to construct the roof with feathers of the cormorant instead of saw grass. However, while they were finishing the roof, she went into labor.

In shame, Toyotama-hime fled, leaving behind her newborn, whom she called Ugayafukiaezu. The roof of the birthing hut had not been completely thatched (fukiaezu) with cormorant feathers (ugaya) when his mother gave birth to him, which explains his name.

Later, when Ugayafukiaezu reached adulthood, he married his aunt, Tamayori-hime, and they had four children: Hikoitsuse, Inai, Mikeirinu, and Hikohohodemi (later Emperor Jimmu).

Mikeirinu traveled to Tokoyo, the "Everworld", and Inai went into the ocean to be with his mother. The eldest and youngest set forth to rule the land and while they did so together for a time, after Hikoitsuse died, their youngest became the first ruler.

Genealogy
Ugayafukiaezu is in the Three generations of Hyuga, a time period between  Tenson kōrin and Jimmu's Eastern Expedition.

References

External links
Encyclopedia of Shinto

Japanese gods
Shinto kami